Sergio Ciattaglia (born in Cañada de Gómez, Argentina) 10 June 1967 is a former Argentine footballer who played for clubs of Argentina and Chile.

Teams
  Rosario Central 1988-1991                                                                                                                                                        
  Cobreloa 1991
  Argentino de Rosario 1992-1994
  Central Córdoba 1995-1997
  Olimpo de Bahía Blanca 1997-2000
  Juventud Antoniana 2000-2001
  Cipolletti 2001-2004
  Alianza de Cutral Có 2004
  Independiente de Neuquén 2005-2008

References
 

Living people
Argentine footballers
Argentine expatriate footballers
Club Atlético Independiente footballers
Juventud Antoniana footballers
Club Cipolletti footballers
Olimpo footballers
Cobreloa footballers
Chilean Primera División players
Argentine Primera División players
Expatriate footballers in Chile
Argentino de Rosario footballers
Association footballers not categorized by position
Year of birth missing (living people)
Rosario Central footballers